Marine Aviation Logistics Squadron 49 (MALS-49) is a reserve aviation logistics support unit of the United States Marine Corps. They are currently based at Stewart Air National Guard Base in Newburgh, New York and fall under the command of Marine Aircraft Group 49 (MAG-49) and the 4th Marine Aircraft Wing (4th MAW). The squadron 49 is the only MALS in the 4th MAW with an active duty core of maintenance and aviation supply personnel. MALS-49 is currently structured with six separate and distinct divisions of maintenance, supporting three separate and distinct sites, along with five flying squadrons.

Mission
 Provide training and support for SMCR units to ensure readiness for mobilization.
 Provide aerial refueling service in support of Fleet Marine Force operations 
 Provide air transport for personnel, equipment and supplies. 
 Conduct other air operations as may be directed.
 Provide intermediate maintenance activity support to the squadrons assigned to MAG-49.
 Provide the requisite aviation supply support MAG-49.

History
MALS-49 was activated on 1 July 1969 at Naval Air Station New York in Brooklyn, New York as Headquarters and Maintenance Squadron 49 (H&MS-49). The H&MS unit was relocated to Naval Air Station Lakehurst, New Jersey in 1970 and moved again to Naval Air Station Willow Grove, Pennsylvania in 1972.

In 1988, the unit was redesignated as Marine Aviation Logistics Squadron 49 with the headquarters located at NAS Willow Grove. During 1988 detachments were established at Andrews Air Force Base, Washington DC and Naval Air Station South Weymouth, Massachusetts. In 1992, the Marine Aviation Logistics Squadron 42 (MALS-42) detachment located at Stewart ANGB, Newburgh, New York was redesignated as a detachment of MALS-49, bringing the number of sites supported by MALS-49 to four. In February 1994 the MALS-49 flag was relocated from NAS Willow Groove to Stewart ANGB

In 2004, the unit activated reserve Marines in support of Operation Iraqi Freedom to serve as augmentees for MALS-16 when they deployed to Iraq.

See also

 United States Marine Corps Aviation
 Organization of the United States Marine Corps
 List of United States Marine Corps aviation support units

Notes

References

Bibliography

Web
 MALS-49's official website

Military units and formations in New York (state)
4th Marine Aircraft Wing
LOG49